Tingupidae is a family of millipedes in the order Chordeumatida. Adult millipedes in this family have 28 or 30 segments (counting the collum as the first segment and the telson as the last). There are 2 genera and 13 described species in Tingupidae.

Genera
 Blancosoma Shear & Hubbard, 1998
 Tingupa Chamberlin, 1910

References

Further reading

 
 
 
 

Chordeumatida
Millipede families